The following are the national records in athletics in the Dominican Republic maintained by Federación Dominicana de Asociaciones de Atletismo (FDAA). So far FDAA maintains an official list only in outdoor events.

Outdoor

Key to tables:

h = hand timing

A = affected by altitude

y = denotes one mile

Men

Women

Mixed

Indoor

Men

Women

Notes

References
General
World Athletics Statistic Handbook 2019: National Outdoor Records
World Athletics Statistic Handbook 2022: National Indoor Records
Dominican Records – Men Outdoor September 2018 updated
Dominican Records – Women Outdoor September 2018 updated
Specific

External links
FEDOMATLE web site

Dominican Republic
Records
Athletics records
Athletics